Robert Weld Mitchell MBE (10 August 1915 – 13 December 1994) was a Progressive Conservative party member of the House of Commons of Canada and a lawyer.

He was born in Toronto, the son of Percy Dawson Mitchell and Olive Weld, and was educated at Ridley College and Osgoode Hall.  Mitchell was called to the Ontario bar in 1958. He was a director of William Weld Co. Ltd., served as president of the London Boy Scouts Association, was president of the London Chamber of Commerce from 1962 to 1963 and served as vice-president of Supertest Petroleum, later part of BP Canada.

Between 1940 and 1945, Mitchell served in the Canadian Army with The Perth Regiment.

He was first elected at the London riding in the 1953 general election. After serving only one federal term, the 22nd Canadian Parliament, Mitchell left federal politics and did not seek re-election. He died in 1994.

References

1915 births
1994 deaths
Members of the House of Commons of Canada from Ontario
Lawyers in Ontario
Politicians from Toronto
Progressive Conservative Party of Canada MPs